Kranz  may refer to:

 Kranz (surname)
 Kranz Maduke, fictional character in Black Cat comic series

See also 
 Frankfurter Kranz, cake 
 Krantz, a surname
 Cranz (disambiguation)
 Crantz (1722–1799), European botanist & physician Heinrich Johann Nepomuk von Crantz